Ronjay Reyes Enrile (born August 20, 1982 in Quezon City) is a Filipino professional basketball player who last played for the Pasig Pirates of the Maharlika Pilipinas Basketball League (MPBL).

References

External links
 PBA-Online! Profile

Filipino men's basketball players
Living people
1982 births
Basketball players from Quezon City
Letran Knights basketball players
Powerade Tigers players
Maharlika Pilipinas Basketball League players
Point guards
Powerade Tigers draft picks